U.S. Route 70 Alternate (US 70A) is a  alternate route to US 70 between Brownsville, and Huntingdon in West Tennessee. Signage along this route, and on most maps, show it as US 70A and not US 70 Alternate.

Route description

Haywood County

US 70A begins in Haywood County in Brownsville at an intersection with US 70/US 79/SR 1/SR 76 just east of downtown. It heads north, concurrent with US 79 and unsigned SR 76, along Dupree Street to bypass downtown along its east side to come to an intersection with SR 369, where the highway turns east along N Washington Avenue to leave Brownsville and pass through farmland and rural areas for several miles before crossing into Crockett County via a bridge over the South Fork of the Forked Deer River.

Crockett County

US 70A/US 79 almost immediately enter Bells, where they pass through downtown along High Street and have an intersection with SR 88. They then have an interchange with US 412/SR 20 before leaving Bells and continuing northeast to pass through Fruitvale and Gadsden, where they have an intersection with SR 221, before crossing into Gibson County via a bridge over the Middle Fork of the Forked Deer River.

Gibson County

They immediately enter Humboldt and have an interchange with US 70A Bypass/US 79 Bypass/SR 366. US 70A/US 79 pass through neighborhoods along W Main Street to enter downtown, where they become concurrent with US 45W Business/SR 5. US 70A/US 79 now split off along Eastend Drive to pass through neighborhoods and have an intersection with SR 152 before having another intersection with US 70A, US 79 Bypass, SR 366, and US 45W. The highway then leaves Humboldt and continues northeast through rural areas, where they have an intersection with SR 187. US 70A/US 79 now pass through Gibson, where they have an intersection with SR 186, before crossing the North Fork of the Forked Deer River and entering Milan. They pass through the city as Van Hook Street, where they have an intersection with US 45E/SR 43/SR 77/SR 104, with unsigned SR 77 becoming concurrent with US 70A/US 79/SR 76 here. US 70A/US 79 have an intersection with SR 425 before leaving Milan passing through rural farmland, where they cross over the Rutherford Fork of the Obion River shortly before crossing into Carroll County.

Carroll County

US 70A/US 79 immediately enter the town of Atwood, where they pass through the town along Main Street and have an intersection with SR 220 before coming to a Y-Intersection where US 70A and US 79 split, with US 70A following SR 77 east while US 79 follows SR 76 north. US 70A has an intersection with SR 220 Alternate before leaving Atwood and continuing east to pass through McLemoresville, where it has an intersection with SR 105. It has an intersection with SR 436 before passing through more wooded terrain for a few miles to enter Huntingdon at an intersection with SR 22. SR 22 joins the concurrency and they turn north to bypass downtown along its west side on Veterans Drive before coming to an intersection with SR 22 Business, where SR 22 splits and heads north. US 70A curves to the east along the city’s north side for a couple of miles, where SR 77 splits off and US 70A begins following unsigned SR 364. US 70A now turns south for a short distance before coming to an end at an intersection with US 70 Business and US 70 (SR 1/SR 364) on Huntingdon’s east side.

Major intersections

Humboldt bypass route

U.S. Route 70A Bypass (US 70 Bypass or US 70A Byp.) is a bypass route of US 70A in Humboldt, Tennessee. It runs concurrently with US 79 Bypass and unsigned SR 366 for its entire length.

The highway begins as a two-lane highway at an interchange with US 70A/US 79 (W Main Street/SR 76 at the southwestern edge of town. It heads north through some industrial areas, where it has an intersection with SR 152. The highway then curves to the east through more industrial areas to cross a railroad overpass and enter a business district and come to an intersection with US 45W and US 45W Business (N Central Avenue/SR 5), where it widens to a four-lane highway and US 45W joins the highway. They then pass through some neighborhoods, where they cross over another railroad overpass, before US 70A Bypass/US 79 Bypass come to an end at an intersection with US 70A/US 79 (Eastend Drive/SR 76), with the Humboldt Bypass, and unsigned SR 366, continuing south along US 45W.

References

70A
Transportation in Haywood County, Tennessee
Transportation in Crockett County, Tennessee
Transportation in Gibson County, Tennessee
Transportation in Carroll County, Tennessee
70A (Tennessee)
A (Tennessee)